Ramagondanahalli is a suburb near the Whitefield area of Bengaluru. There are many celebrations held in this town e.g. Karaga that is held in the month of March on a full moon day. There are many shops in this town such as Dominos, Goli vada pav, Honda showroom, Bajaj showroom, Honda showroom etc.
Sigma tech park is situated in this area. There are many apartments coming such as DNR atmosphere, SVS silver woods etc. It comes under the constituency of Mahadevpura. It is mostly populated with vannikula kshatriyas (thigalas). There are many temples in this town. There is a big hospital i.e. Manipal. Palm meadows, a luxury gated community is also an attraction to many foreigners, who prefer to be a resident here looking for some peace and quiet. There is a huge lake. Famous story writer Suresh Padmanaban native of Kallakurichi resides here.

Current MP: PC Mohan (Bangalore central)

Current MLA: Arvind Limbavali (Mahadevpura constituency)

Current Corporator: S Uday Kumar (ward number-84)

Its PIN code is 560066.

Coordinates:   12°57'19"N   77°44'22"E

Neighbourhoods in Bangalore